Gregory Michael Davids (born August 28, 1958) is a Minnesota politician and member of the Minnesota House of Representatives. A member of the Republican Party of Minnesota, he represents District 26B, which includes parts of Fillmore, Houston, and Mower Counties in the southeastern part of the state. Davids is a retirement financial adviser, an insurance agency owner, and a former schoolteacher.

Early life, education, and career
Davids graduated from Spring Valley High School, then attended Waldorf College in Forest City, Iowa, and Winona State University in Winona, where he earned his B.S. in social science. He also attended graduate school at Mankato State University in Mankato. He was appointed to the Preston City Council in 1986, and was elected mayor in 1987, serving until his election to the House in 1991.

Minnesota House of Representatives
Davids was first elected in a special election on February 12, 1991, held after Representative Elton Redalen resigned to become Minnesota's Commissioner of Agriculture. He was reelected every two years until 2006, when Democrat Ken Tschumper unseated him by 49 votes. Davids regained the seat in the 2008 election, and has been reelected every cycle since then. He is the longest-serving Republican in the Minnesota House of Representatives.

From 1999 to 2004, Davids chaired the Commerce, Jobs and Economic Development Committee. During the 2005-06 biennium, he chaired the Agriculture and Rural Development Committee. That session he also served as speaker pro tempore for the Republican majority, a position he also held during the 2011-12 biennium. Davids also chaired the Taxes Committee for six years of non-consecutive Republican control, from 2011 to 2012 and from 2015 to 2018. He is now the minority lead on the Taxes Committee.

References

External links 

 Rep. Davids Web Page
 Minnesota Public Radio Votetracker: Rep. Greg Davids
 Project Votesmart - Rep. Greg Davids Profile

1958 births
Living people
People from Preston, Minnesota
Republican Party members of the Minnesota House of Representatives
Waldorf University alumni
People from Forest City, Iowa
21st-century American politicians
American United Methodists
Minnesota State University, Mankato alumni